The Pantyikali (Bandjigali) dialect, also called Baarundji (meaning the people of the Paroo River) or Weyneubulcoo (Wanyuparlku, Wanyiwalku), is a dialect of the Paakantyi language.  Pantyikali is spoken in New South Wales, Australia, northwest, north, and west of White Cliffs. It is not extinct, with four speakers reported in 2005.

The Pantyikali people of the Paakantyi were extensively studied and photographed in the 19th century by Frederic Bonney, the owner of Momba Station.

The major work on the Paakantyi language and its dialects has been that of linguist Luise Hercus.

References

Pama–Nyungan languages
Endangered indigenous Australian languages in New South Wales